Daniel K Judd (born September 17, 1956) is an American religious leader and educator who served as the first counselor to A. Roger Merrill in the Sunday School General Presidency of the Church of Jesus Christ of Latter-day Saints (LDS Church) from 2004 to 2009. Judd also served as chair of the Ancient Scripture Department of Brigham Young University (BYU). In 2019, Judd was named the Dean of BYU's Department of Religious Education.

Born in Kanab, Utah, Judd has a degree in zoology from Southern Utah University and graduate degrees in family science and counseling psychology from BYU. Judd was a teacher in the church's Seminaries and Institutes of Religion in Utah, Arizona, and Michigan.  He was also a professor of family sciences at Brigham Young University–Idaho. Judd is currently a professor of Ancient Scripture at BYU. Judd is the author or editor of several books including Religion, Mental Health, and the Latter-day Saints (Bookcraft, 1999); Taking Sides: Clashing Views on Controversial Issues in Religion (McGraw-Hill Dushkin, 2003; and "The Fortunate Fall" (Deseret Book, 2011).

In the mid-1970s, Judd served as a missionary for the LDS Church in the California San Diego Mission. He married Kaye Seegmiller in the St. George Temple and they are the parents of four children. Prior to his call to the Sunday School General Presidency, Judd was president of the church's Orem Utah Canyon View Stake.

From 2011 to 2014, Judd served as president of the church's Ghana Accra Mission.

See also
William D. Oswald

Notes

References
"Daniel K Judd: First Counselor in the Sunday School General Presidency," Liahona, May 2004, p. 125.

1956 births
20th-century Mormon missionaries
American leaders of the Church of Jesus Christ of Latter-day Saints
American Mormon missionaries in the United States
Brigham Young University alumni
Brigham Young University faculty
Brigham Young University–Idaho faculty
Church Educational System instructors
Counselors in the General Presidency of the Sunday School (LDS Church)
Living people
Mission presidents (LDS Church)
People from Kanab, Utah
People from Orem, Utah
American Mormon missionaries in Ghana
21st-century Mormon missionaries
21st-century American zoologists
Latter Day Saints from Utah
Latter Day Saints from Arizona
Latter Day Saints from Michigan
Latter Day Saints from Idaho